Dominique Racine (January 21, 1828 – January 28, 1888) was a Canadian Roman Catholic priest and Bishop of Chicoutimi from 1878 to 1888.

His brother, Antoine Racine, was the first Bishop of Sherbrooke.

References
 

1828 births
1888 deaths
19th-century Roman Catholic bishops in Canada
Roman Catholic bishops of Chicoutimi